Requins de l'Atlantique Football Club is a football club of Benin, playing in the town of Cotonou. They play in the Beninese first division, the Benin Premier League.

Achievements
Benin Premier League: 3
1985, 1987, 1990
Benin Cup: 5
1978, 1981, 1983, 1988, 1989

External links
Team profile – soccerway.com

 
Football clubs in Benin